Lagrange Bay is located  south of Broome, Western Australia in the Kimberley region. It is the site of the Catholic Pallottine La Grange Mission, and the Aboriginal community of Bidyadanga. It was the location of the La Grange massacre and expedition in 1865.

See also
Explorers' Monument

References

Further reading
 Zucker, Margaret.(2005) From patrons to partners and the separated children of the Kimberley : a history of the Catholic Church in the Kimberley, WA Fremantle, W.A. : University of Notre Dame Australia Press. 

Kimberley (Western Australia)
Bays of Western Australia
Australian Aboriginal missions